Vice-Admiral Sir William Nathan Wrighte Hewett,  (12 August 1834 – 13 May 1888) was a Royal Navy officer and a recipient of the Victoria Cross, the highest award for gallantry in the face of the enemy that can be awarded to British and Commonwealth forces. The Hewett Treaty is named after him.

Early life and Crimean War
Hewett was born at Brighton on 12 August 1834 to William Hewett, physician to King William IV. He entered the Royal Navy in 1847, and served as a midshipman in the Second Anglo-Burmese War.

Hewett was in charge of the Right Lancaster Battery at Sevastopol on 26 October 1854. The battery was being threatened by the enemy and, through a misunderstanding, he was ordered to spike his gun and retreat. Disregarding the order, Hewett pulled down the parapet of the battery and with the assistance of some soldiers slewed his gun round and poured on the advancing enemy a most destructive and effectual fire. On 5 November, at the Battle of Inkerman, he again acted with great bravery. For these two actions, he was granted a field promotion to lieutenant and awarded the Victoria Cross, one of the first ever awarded. Hewett's promotion was made official after passing his examinations at Portsmouth; He was subsequently appointed to the royal yacht, from which he was promoted to commander on 13 September 1858.

Senior commands
Hewett's other commands included ,  and, following his promotion to captain on 24 November 1862,  as flag-captain to Sir Henry Kellett. He was Commander-in-Chief, Cape of Good Hope and West Coast of Africa, in charge of naval operations during the Third Anglo-Ashanti War, from 1873. For his services during this conflict, he was made a Knight Commander of the Order of the Bath on 31 March 1874. He commanded  from 1877 until he was drawn into service in the Mahdist War. In 1882 he was appointed Commander-in-Chief, East Indies. Following the British defeat at El Teb, Hewett commanded the naval brigade that landed at Suakin on 6 February 1884, and was appointed governor of Sudan on 10 February by Baker Pasha.

In April 1884, Hewett led a delegation to Emperor Yohannes IV which negotiated, in exchange for free transit of guns and ammunition through Massawa, access through Ethiopian territory for the successful evacuation of the Egyptian garrisons that had been isolated in southern Sudan by the revolt of Muhammad Ahmad (also known as the Mahdi) against the Egyptian rulers.

After his return from Ethiopia, Hewett was appointed Junior Naval Lord and, on 8 July 1884, was promoted to vice admiral. From March 1886 to April 1888 he was in command of the Channel Fleet; however, his delicate health worsened and he died shortly after his retirement.

Hewett's Victoria Cross is displayed at the National Maritime Museum in Greenwich, London.

Notes

External links
Location of grave and VC medal (Hampshire)
 http://www.memorials.inportsmouth.co.uk/vc/hewett.htm

|-

|-

|-

1834 births
1888 deaths
People from Brighton
Royal Navy vice admirals
British recipients of the Victoria Cross
Crimean War recipients of the Victoria Cross
Royal Navy personnel of the Crimean War
British military personnel of the Second Anglo-Burmese War
Royal Navy personnel of the Mahdist War
Recipients of the Legion of Honour
Knights Commander of the Order of the Bath
Knights Commander of the Order of the Star of India
Royal Navy recipients of the Victoria Cross
British military personnel of the Abyssinian War
Lords of the Admiralty